Sir Arthur John Otway, 3rd Baronet PC (8 August 1822 – 8 June 1912) was a British barrister and Liberal politician as well as a champion of administrative reform regarding India.

Background, education and early life
Otway was born in Edinburgh, Scotland, the fourth son of Admiral Sir Robert Otway, 1st Baronet. He was brought up along with the rest of his family in Kemp Town, an estate of Brighton, England. At the age of six, he began his education at Marlborough Place. Following that, he travelled to France and Germany, and eventually began education at the Royal Military College, Sandhurst. Naturally, his first career was in the military. In 1839, he signed on as an ensign of the 51st Yorkshire Light Infantry, which was then stationed in Australia. After two years' service, he was promoted to the 2nd Queen's Regiment, stationed in India. He served with that regiment for approximately five more years, until 1846, at which time he retired from the Army. After his time in the military, he began to study law at the Middle Temple, one of London's four Inns of Court; in 1850 he was called to the Bar.

Political career
Before Otway had held his first brief, however, he began to perceive a need for reform in government, especially regarding the handling of the administration of India. He joined other notables of the time such as John Bright in forming the India Reform Society. Subsequently, he entered public office as a Liberal member of Parliament (MP) for Stafford. He represented that borough from 1852 to 1857. Later, he sat for Chatham from 1865 to 1874 and Rochester from 1878 to 1885.

At the end of 1868, three years into his term as MP of Chatham, Otway was appointed to William Ewart Gladstone's first Government in the post of Under-Secretary of State for Foreign Affairs. He served for three years in that post. His chief was Lord Clarendon, the Secretary of State for Foreign Affairs. Lord Clarendon died on 19 July 1870, the eve of the Franco-Prussian War and was succeeded by Lord Granville. The months that followed were filled with anxiety for all representatives of the Foreign Office, until the war's end in 1871. Otway retired from said post in that year over matters of opinion connected to Russia's treatment of the Black Sea Treaty in the Crimean War.

In 1878, Otway was elected as the MP for Rochester. In 1881, he succeeded his brother as third baronet. Five years later, in 1883, he was appointed Deputy Speaker and Chairman of Ways and Means. He held his post as chairman until 1885, the year he retired from Parliamentary life entirely. In that same year, he became a Privy Councillor.

Business activities
Otway was chairman of the Brighton and South Coast Railway Company. In 1882 he was involved in establishing the Faure Electric Accumulator Company of which he was a founding director.

Family
Otway married Henrietta Langham, daughter of Sir James Langham, on 13 September 1851. They had three children, Henrietta Evelyn Marianne Otway, Phoebe Eleanora Otway and Waller Angelo Otway. His only son, Waller, died unmarried in 1884. His wife died in 1909. Otway survived her by three years and died at 34 Eaton Square, London, in June 1912, aged 89. The baronetcy became extinct on his death.

References

This article includes text from the December 1891 issue of "Brighton and County Magazine", which is presumed to be in the public domain.
Arthur John Otway
Contemporary articles on Sir Arthur Otway, Bt

External links 
 

1822 births
1912 deaths
Graduates of the Royal Military College, Sandhurst
King's Own Yorkshire Light Infantry officers
Queen's Royal Regiment officers
Liberal Party (UK) MPs for English constituencies
Baronets in the Baronetage of the United Kingdom
Members of the Privy Council of the United Kingdom
UK MPs 1852–1857
UK MPs 1865–1868
UK MPs 1868–1874
UK MPs 1874–1880
UK MPs 1880–1885
Members of the Parliament of the United Kingdom for Stafford
Military personnel from Edinburgh
19th-century British Army personnel